The term Down Under is a colloquialism which is differently construed to refer to Australia and New Zealand, or the Pacific island countries collectively. The term comes from the fact that these countries are in the Southern Hemisphere, "below" almost all other countries, on the usual arrangement of a map or globe which places cardinal north at the top.

The term has been in use since the late 19th century and the persistence of the media use of the term has led to its wide acceptance and usage, especially in reference to Australia. The Men at Work song "Down Under" became a patriotic rallying song for Australians. The Russian-Australian boxing champion Kostya Tszyu was nicknamed "The Thunder from Down Under", as is Australian snooker player Neil Robertson. When the then Miss Australia Jennifer Hawkins was crowned as Miss Universe 2004 in Quito, Ecuador, she was called by the same nickname by host Billy Bush.

According to Roger Ebert's tongue-in-cheek Glossary of Movie Terms, the Down Under Rule:

The Tour Down Under is a cycling race in and around Adelaide, South Australia, and since 2009 has been the inaugural event of the UCI World Tour Ranking calendar, which culminates in the Giro di Lombardia.

References

Further reading 
 
 

Australian culture
New Zealand culture
English-language idioms